The 3rd Iowa Cavalry Regiment was a cavalry regiment that served in the Union Army during the American Civil War.

Service
The 3rd Iowa Cavalry was organized at Keokuk, Iowa and mustered in for three years of Federal service between August 30, 1861, and September 14, 1861.

The regiment was mustered out of Federal service on August 9, 1865.

Total strength and casualties
A total of  2,165 men served in the 3rd Iowa at one time or another during its existence.
It suffered 5 officers and 79 enlisted men who were killed in action or who died of their wounds and 4 officers and 230 enlisted men who died of disease, for a total of 318 fatalities.

Commanders
 Colonel Cyrus Bussey
 Colonel Henry C. Caldwell
 Colonel John Willock Noble

Other Notable People
Charlotte Hatfield, who may have served with the 3rd Iowa Cavalry under an assumed name.
John Pickler, United States Representative from South Dakota.
Calvary M. Young, who captured a Confederate brigadier general in 1864, during Price's Raid into Missouri and Kansas.

See also
List of Iowa Civil War Units
Iowa in the American Civil War

Notes

References
The Civil War Archive

Units and formations of the Union Army from Iowa
1861 establishments in Iowa
Military units and formations established in 1861
Military units and formations disestablished in 1865